U.S. Special Operations Command Europe (SOCEUR, pronounced “Sock-Yer”) is a subordinate unified command of United States Special Operations Command (SOCOM, pronounced So-Comm).

Function

Based at Patch Barracks near Stuttgart, Germany, SOCEUR's function is to plan for use of Special Operations forces within EUCOM's area of responsibility, employ the forces, and assess whether they are achieving the desired results.  SOCEUR conducts these activities as part of the US effort to strengthen the military capabilities and security of partner nations in Europe and counter threats to the US and its European partners.

Components

Forces of the United States Special Operations Command for which SOCEUR is responsible include: 1st Battalion, 10th Special Forces Group (Airborne); Naval Special Warfare Unit 2; 352d Special Operations Wing; and the SOCEUR Signal Detachment.

Geographic focus

SOCEUR's area of responsibility is based on EUCOM's.  It consists of 51 countries, and extends from Greenland to the European continent.  It includes all of Russia, the Mediterranean Sea, the Caucasus region, and Israel.

History
In 1955, the US European Command established Support Operations Command Europe to provide planning and operational control for Special Operations forces in the EUCOM area of responsibility. Later that year, EUCOM re-designated the new unit as Support Operations Task Force Europe (SOTFE).

When France withdrew from the North Atlantic Treaty Organization (NATO) in 1967, SOTFE moved from its headquarters in Paris to Panzer Kaserne near Stuttgart, West Germany.  In 1968, SOTFE moved to Patch Barracks.

As part of the Goldwater-Nichols Act reforms, on May 30, 1986, SOCEUR was confirmed by the Joint Chiefs of Staff as a subordinate unified command of EUCOM and the EUCOM Special Operations Director took on the added role of SOCEUR commander 

Originally focused on containment of the Union of Soviet Socialist Republics during the Cold War, after the Warsaw Pact ended in 1991 SOCEUR's focus shifted to other European countries, Africa and the Middle East. Since then, SOCEUR and its components have taken part in special operations during Operations Desert Storm, Provide Comfort and Provide Comfort II. In addition, prior to the creation of the US Africa Command (AFRICOM) and Special Operations Command Africa, SOCEUR took part in activities in Africa to include Silver Anvil (Sierra Leone) and Atlas Response (Mozambique).  SOCEUR also participated in operations in the Balkans, including Joint Endeavor, Joint Guard, Allied Force, Operation Enduring Freedom, and Operation Iraqi Freedom.

Commanders
Commanders of Special Operations Command Europe since its establishment as a EUCOM subordinate unified command include:

James T. “Terry” Scott, July 1987 - September 1989
Richard W. Potter Jr., September 1989 - July 1992
Keith Kellogg, July 1992 - 1994
Michael A. Canavan, 1994 - July 1996
Geoffrey C. Lambert, August 1996 - July 1998
Eldon A. Bargewell, August 1998 - June 2000
Leslie L. Fuller, July 2000 - July 2002
Gary M. Jones, July 2002 - August 2003
Thomas R. Csrnko, August 2003 - June 2006
William H. McRaven, June 2006 - March 2008
Michael S. Repass (acting), March 2008 - May 2008
Frank J. Kisner, May 2008 - July 2010
Michael S. Repass, July 2010 - July 2013
 MG Marshall B. Webb, July 2013 - August 2014
 Maj Gen Gregory Lengyel, August 2014 - June 2016
 MG Mark C. Schwartz, June 2016 - June 2018
 Maj Gen Kirk W. Smith, June 2018 - August 2020
 Maj Gen David H. Tabor, August 3, 2020 - June 2022
 Maj Gen Steven G. Edwards, June 28, 2022 - present

References

Sources

Internet

News

Magazines

Books

+Europe
Organisations based in Stuttgart
Military units and formations established in 1986
1986 establishments in West Germany
United States military in Stuttgart